24 Marsh Wall, also known as Landmark East, is a 44-storey residential skyscraper in Docklands, London, which is among the tallest structures in the city. Landmark East is part of a broader residential neighbourhood, The Landmark, also comprising the 30 story Landmark West at 22 Marsh Wall, two adjacent mid-rise apartment buildings, and the Landmark Pinnacle.

Design 
Designed by architects Squire and Partners in conjunction with Hoare Lea (M&E Consulting Engineers) and Manhire Associates (Structural Engineers), the taller eastern tower is 140 m (459 ft) with 44 storeys, making it one of Europe's tallest residential buildings, and its shorter neighbour to the west is 98 m (322 ft) with 30 storeys. The towers are located on the south-western edge of the Canary Wharf estate, close to the River Thames and a short walk from the 280,000 m2 (3 million square feet) office development, Riverside South.

History 
By August 2007 all 276 apartments had been reserved. Luxury shops occupy the ground floor, fully encompassed within a glass-covered piazza. A 24-hour concierge and residents' gymnasium are among the development's other features.

In 2007, the development received recognition as the Best High Rise Development and Best High Rise Architecture in the Daily Mail UK Property Awards. It was finished in 2010.

References

External links 
 
 
 Skyscrapernews data
 Case Study of Structure

Canary Wharf buildings
Buildings and structures in the London Borough of Tower Hamlets
Residential skyscrapers in London
Twin towers
Residential buildings completed in 2010